The Palm Treo 800w is a combination PDA/cell phone offered exclusively by Sprint. It is Palm's third Windows Mobile Treo. The short-lived device was replaced by the Treo Pro.

Specifications
Mobile phone, CDMA model with 800/1900-MHz bands, with EV-DO Rev.A data.
Built-in aGPS
Texas Instruments 333 MHz ARM-based processor
128 MB RAM and 256 MB flash storage (~170 MB user accessible)
Windows Mobile 6.1 Professional
4.41 x 2.28 x 0.73 in (112 x 58 x 18 mm)
4.94 ounces (140 grams)
16-bit Color 320x320 TFT touchscreen display
Supports MicroSD and MicroSDHC cards
Built-In Bluetooth 2.0 EDR
2-megapixel digital camera
Built-in 802.11b/g Wi-Fi
1150 mAh standard, rechargeable lithium-ion battery
Infrared port

Extra Features
The Treo 800w is the first Palm phone to support A2DP, which allows the user to stream music to a supported device wirelessly over Bluetooth.

See also
Treo 700wx - Palm's previous Windows Mobile Smartphone
Treo Pro - the replacement for the 800w

References

Specifications

Windows Mobile Professional devices
Palm mobile phones